Hesar (also Romanized as Ḩeşār; also known as Ḩeşār-e Māzūl) is a village in Fazl Rural District, in the Central District of Nishapur County, Razavi Khorasan Province, Iran. At the 2006 census, its population was 270, in 85 families.

References 

Populated places in Nishapur County